The Station Inn is a concert venue in Nashville, Tennessee that hosts bluegrass music acts. Frommers wrote that it is "widely regarded as one of the best bluegrass venues around".  The small nightclub has a reputation for being a simple building, located near Music Row in proximity to Nashville's major country music recording studios and related businesses, where local and national bluegrass artists and fans convene. 

Notable artists such as Bill Monroe, Ricky Skaggs, Alison Krauss, Peter Rowan, Sam Bush, Gillian Welch, Ralph Stanley, Dolly Parton, Randy Travis, Reba McEntire and Off the Wagon have performed at The Station Inn. Mel Gibson and U2 have visited the club as well.

In 2020, the owner of the Station Inn, J.T. Gray, was inducted into the Bluegrass Music Hall of Fame.

References

External links 
 Official site

Culture of Nashville, Tennessee
Music venues in Tennessee
Tourist attractions in Nashville, Tennessee
Buildings and structures in Nashville, Tennessee
1974 establishments in Tennessee
Event venues established in 1974